Salem Ali Ibrahim Hassan Al-Hammadi (Arabic:سالم علي إبراهيم حسن الحمادي) (born 27 September 1993) is an Emirati footballer. He currently plays as a midfielder for Khor Fakkan.

External links

References

Emirati footballers
1993 births
Living people
Al Jazira Club players
Baniyas Club players
Khor Fakkan Sports Club players
Footballers at the 2014 Asian Games
Place of birth missing (living people)
UAE Pro League players
Association football midfielders
Asian Games competitors for the United Arab Emirates